In ice hockey, an awarded goal is an unusual situation in which a goal is awarded to a team rather than scored. A penalty shot is a type of penalty awarded when a team loses a clear scoring opportunity on a breakaway because of a foul committed by an opposing player. A player from the non-offending team is given an attempt to score a goal without opposition from any defending players except the goaltender. However, when such a lost opportunity occurs and the opposing team has pulled its goalie to allow for an extra attacker, a goal is simply awarded without a penalty shot taking place.

In the Deutsche Eishockey Liga and National Hockey League, a goal can also be awarded if the goaltender deliberately knocks the goalpost off its moorings to stop a breakaway.

A goal can also be automatically awarded during a penalty shot or a shootout, if the goaltender attempts to stop the attacker performing the penalty shot in an illegal manner.

Background
In ice hockey, a goal is scored when the puck completely crosses the goal line between the two goal posts and below the goal crossbar. A goal awards one point to the team attacking the goal scored upon, regardless of which team the player who actually deflected the puck into the goal belongs to (see also own goal). Typically, a player on the team attempting to score shoots the puck with his/her stick towards the goal net opening, and a player on the opposing team called a goaltender tries to block the shot to prevent a goal from being scored against his/her team.

A team may only have six players actively playing ("on the ice") at a time. A common tactic often employed by the trailing team toward the end of the game is to remove the goaltender (the "goalie") from the game in order to have all six players available for offense. This is called pulling the goalie.

Under normal circumstances, a penalty shot is awarded to the player who lost the opportunity to score due to the penalty. Said player is given a one-on-one opportunity against the offending team's goaltender to score a goal. However, if the goaltender had been pulled, most ice hockey rule books automatically award the goal, assuming that if not for the penalty, the goal would have been scored.

See also 
 Goaltending penalty in basketball
 Penalty try in rugby union and rugby league
 Unfair act in gridiron football

References 
 

Ice hockey terminology